Andrés López Correa (born 9 May 1992) is a Mexican badminton player from Mexico City. He was the bronze medalist at the 2011 Pan American Games in the men's doubles event partnered with Lino Muñoz. López also part of the national team that clinched the gold medal at the 2018 Central American and Caribbean Games in Barranquilla, Colombia.

Achievements

Pan American Games 
Men's doubles

Pan Am Championships
Men's doubles

Mixed doubles

Central American and Caribbean Games 
Men's doubles

Mixed doubles

BWF International Challenge/Series (6 titles, 3 runners-up) 
Men's doubles

Mixed doubles

  BWF International Challenge tournament
  BWF International Series tournament
  BWF Future Series tournament

References

External links 
 

1992 births
Living people
Sportspeople from Mexico City
Mexican male badminton players
Badminton players at the 2011 Pan American Games
Badminton players at the 2019 Pan American Games
Pan American Games bronze medalists for Mexico
Pan American Games medalists in badminton
Medalists at the 2011 Pan American Games
Competitors at the 2010 Central American and Caribbean Games
Competitors at the 2018 Central American and Caribbean Games
Central American and Caribbean Games gold medalists for Mexico
Central American and Caribbean Games silver medalists for Mexico
Central American and Caribbean Games bronze medalists for Mexico
Central American and Caribbean Games medalists in badminton
21st-century Mexican people